Munroella myiopitina is a species of tephritid or fruit flies in the genus Munroella of the family Tephritidae.

Distribution
Kenya, Malawi, Zimbabwe, South Africa.

References

Tephritinae
Taxa named by Mario Bezzi
Insects described in 1924
Diptera of Africa